Platycodin D is a bio-active isolate from roots of Platycodon grandiflorus. It has been studied for its spermicidal effects as a contraceptive in humans.

Notes
Lead compounds for anti-inflammatory drugs isolated from the plants of the traditional oriental medicine in Korea

References

Phytochemicals